South Point High School (formerly Belmont High School) is a public high school in Belmont, North Carolina, United States. It was established in 1964 and is part of the Gaston County Schools district.

History 
South Point High School was completed on South Point Road in 1964 as Belmont High School, replacing a building on North Central Avenue which became Belmont Middle School, and adopted its present name in 1969 after it merged with Cramerton High School and Reid High School. It lost approximately 200 students to Stuart W. Cramer High School in nearby Cramerton (but with a Belmont address) when the latter school opened in 2013.

Mascot 
The school's mascot is the Red Raider. The origins of the mascot are in dispute, being either derived from soldiers who rubbed red clay on their faces during the Battle of Kings Mountain or adopted from the Colgate University mascot, which was formerly named the Red Raider before being recognized as racially insensitive in 2001. In 2015, a letter to the school board from a Native American tribe member complained that the Red Raiders logo promotes racism. In 2020, rival petitions to either remove or retain the mascot circulated.

Notable alumni 
 Emily Fortune Feimster, writer, comedian, and actress
 Perry Fewell, football coach
 Mitch Harris, MLB player
 Devon Lowery, MLB player
 Nick Muse, NFL tight end, younger brother of Tanner Muse
 Tanner Muse, NFL linebacker, two-time CFP National Champion with Clemson
 Koren Robinson, NFL wide receiver and Pro Bowl selection in 2005
 Jeffrey Springs, MLB player
 Hal Stowe, MLB player

References

External links 
 

Public high schools in North Carolina
Schools in Gaston County, North Carolina
Educational institutions established in 1964
1964 establishments in North Carolina